Nakasuk (Inuktitut syllabics: ᓇᑲᓱᒃ ) was an Inuk who was born at a sealing camp near Pangnirtung, Northwest Territories (now Nunavut) in the early 20th century and grew up around Kimmirut (formerly Lake Harbour).  He assisted a US Navy party wintering on Baffin Island during the 1941–1942 winter to find a suitable location for a US air base.  

The site they selected is the location of the modern community of Iqaluit. Nakasuk remained at the site to assist the Americans in establishing their base, and settled there permanently after its completion, becoming Iqaluit's first permanent resident. He is therefore remembered as the founder of Iqaluit, and Nakasuk Elementary School  is named in his honour.

His name means "bladder" in Inuktitut.

External links
Crystal Two: The Origin of Iqaluit 
 Nakasuk is an Eskimo Manuscript at Dartmouth College Library

Inuit from the Northwest Territories
Canadian people of World War II
City founders
People from Iqaluit
People from Pangnirtung
People from Kimmirut
Date of birth missing
Possibly living people